State Road 545 is a discontinuous route consisting of a northern section and a southern section.

The southern section connects State Road 66 (SR 66) at the town of Troy to State Road 62 in Saint Meinrad.  This section is very scenic, winding and narrow.

The northern section connects State Road 164 (SR 164) with State Road 56 (SR 56) in eastern Dubois County, passing the town of Dubois.

Route description

Southern section 
From the southern terminus SR 545 heads north.  Then SR 545 turns northeast towards Fulda.  After Fulda, SR 545 heads northeast towards St. Meinrad.

Northern section 
From the southern terminus of the northern section SR 545 heads northeast, then back northwest towards Dubois.  From Dubois SR 545 heads due north towards SR 56.  This section of the highway is named for Indiana State Representative Dennis Heeke, who lobbied for the extension of the route from the town of Dubois south to SR 164.

Major intersections

References

External links

 Indiana Highway Ends - SR 545

545
Transportation in Perry County, Indiana
Transportation in Spencer County, Indiana
Transportation in Dubois County, Indiana